A Teal organisation is an organization that adheres to an organizational theory based on workers' self-management. The term was coined in 2014 by Frederic Laloux in his book Reinventing Organizations. Laloux uses a descriptive model in which he describes different types of organizations in terms of colour, and he cites studies by evolutionary and social psychologists including Jean Gebser, Clare W. Graves, Don Edward Beck, Chris Cowan and Ken Wilber.

Model
Laloux defines a "teal" organisation as one where the management is based on worker autonomy and peer relationships. He contrasts this to "red", "amber", "orange", and "green" organisations which, according to Laloux' theory, are based on hierarchies, meritocracy, or consensus decisions. The theory is also based on the concepts of "wholeness", where a worker's "Self-awareness" is more important than their professional persona, and on an "evolutionary purpose", claiming that an organisation is similar to a biological organism.

Examples
A number of notable organisations around the world have adopted and operate with the Teal organisation model some of which are in the table below:

{| class="wikitable"
|- style="vertical-align:bottom;"
! Organization !! Business,mission, oractivity !! Officelocation(s) || Ref.
|- style="vertical-align:top;"
| Morning Star Co. || food processing || United States || 
|- style="vertical-align:top;"
| Culture Unplugged || Socio-Cultural Activism + Integral Health || Global, since 2007  || 

|- style="vertical-align:top;"
| Patagonia || apparel || United States  || 
|- style="vertical-align:top;"
| Sounds True || media || United States  || 
|- style="vertical-align:top;"
| AES || energy sector ||  || 
|- style="vertical-align:top;"
| Buurtzorg || health care || Netherlands  || 
|- style="vertical-align:top;"
| ESBZ || K–12 school || Germany  || 
|- style="vertical-align:top;"
| Heiligenfeld || mental health hospitals || Germany  || 
|- style="vertical-align:top;"
| Nucor || steel manufacturing ||  || 
|- style="vertical-align:top;"
| Varkey Foundation || non-profit withexpertise in Education ||  || 
|- style="vertical-align:top;"
| Thomsen Trampedach || brand protection || Denmark || 
|}

See also
 Alternative Theory of Organization and Management
 Sociocracy
 Holacracy
 Holistic management (agriculture)
 Organizational culture
 Organization development

References

Further reading
Frederic Laloux, Reinventing Organizations: A Guide to Creating Organizations Inspired by the Next Stage of Human Consciousness. Nelson Parker.February 9, 2014.
 Brown, S. L., & Eisenhardt, K. M. 1997. The Art of Continuous Change: Linking Complexity Theory and Time-paced Evolution in Relentlessly Shifting Organizations. Administrative Science Quarterly, 42: 1–34
 Burns, S., & Stalker, G. M. 1961. The Management of Innovation. London: Tavistock Publications
 Wheatley, M. & Kellner-Rogers, M. 1999. A Simpler Way. San Francisco: Berrett-Koehler

Organizational studies
Organizational theory
Management systems
Business economics